HMS Surf was a S-class submarine of the third batch built for the Royal Navy during World War II. She survived the war and was scrapped in 1948.

Design and description
The third batch was slightly enlarged and improved over the preceding second batch of the S-class. They displaced  on the surface and  submerged. The S-class submarines had a crew of 48 officers and ratings.

For surface running, the boats were powered by two  diesel engines, each driving one propeller shaft. When submerged each propeller was driven by a  electric motor. They could reach  on the surface and  underwater.

The boats were armed with seven  torpedo tubes. A half-dozen of these were in the bow and there was one external tube in the stern. They carried six reload torpedoes for the bow tubes for a grand total of thirteen torpedoes. Twelve mines could be carried in lieu of the internally stowed torpedoes. They were also armed with a  deck gun.

Construction and career
HMS Surf was built by Cammell Laird and launched on 10 December 1942. Thus far she has been the only ship of the Royal Navy to bear the name Surf. The boat served in the Mediterranean and the Far East during the Second World War.  Whilst in the Mediterranean, she damaged the German auxiliary patrol vessel GA 54 / Chiaros and sank the German merchant Sonia.  On transferral to the Far East, she sank a small Japanese tug and a barge, and laid mines in the Strait of Malacca. Surf survived the war and was sold on 28 October 1949.  She arrived at Faslane in July 1950 for breaking up.

Notes

References
 
  
 
 
 

 

British S-class submarines (1931)
Ships built on the River Mersey
1942 ships
World War II submarines of the United Kingdom
Royal Navy ship names